Sylvia Acevedo (born 1956/1957) is an American engineer and businesswoman.  She was the chief executive officer (CEO) of the Girl Scouts of the USA from 2016 to 2020. A systems engineer by education, she began her career at NASA's Jet Propulsion Laboratory, where she was on the Voyager 2 team. She has held executive roles at Apple, Dell, and Autodesk. In 2018, Acevedo was included in a Forbes list of "America's Top 50 Women In Tech". She was a founder, with 3 others of REBA Technology, an infiniband company that was sold and also the Founder and CEO of CommuniCard. As CEO of Girl Scouts of the USA, Acevedo led the organization's largest release of badges, over 100 badges in STEM and Outdoors over three years.

Early life and education 
Sylvia Acevedo was born near Ellsworth Air Force Base in South Dakota where her father was serving as an officer in the military. Her family moved to Las Cruces, New Mexico. She joined the Girl Scouts at age 7.  She was active in the local Brownie troop, where she was encouraged to pursue her scientific interests in school. Acevedo collected newspaper articles about the space program and built Estes model rockets from a paper-and-plastic kits. 

In 1979 she earned a B.S. in industrial engineering from New Mexico State University. The National GEM Consortium awarded Acevedo with the GEM Fellowship to fund her graduate school studies at Stanford University. She was one of the first Hispanic students at Stanford University to earn a M.S. in systems engineering.   In her memoir, "Path to the Stars," Acevedo revealed that it was stargazing on her first Brownies Girl Scout trip that ignited her interest in science.

Career 

Acevedo joined IBM in 1980 as an engineer while studying at Stanford University. She was on the Solar Polar Solar Probe (SPSP) and Voyager 2 teams at the NASA Jet Propulsion Laboratory. She joined Apple in 1988 overseeing the Asia-Pacific region. Acevedo held other executive roles at Autodesk, Dell, REBA Technologies, and Tandem Ungermann-Bass.

Acevedo founded Austin, TX-based CommuniCard. She was awarded the Business Award by The Aguila Awards Foundation in 2005. In 2009, Acevedo joined the Girl Scouts of the USA national board of directors. President Barack Obama appointed Acevedo to the Commission on Educational Excellence for Hispanics in 2011.

Acevedo was a national board member of the Girl Scout of the USA from 2009 to 2016. Acevedo is a former board member of the Hispanic Scholarship Consortium, Con Mi Madre and the Trinity School. Acevedo served on the founding executive board of the Ann Richards School for Young Women Leaders. In July 2016 she was appointed interim CEO of the Girl Scouts of the USA. 

Acevedo was appointed permanent CEO of the Girl Scouts of the USA in May 2017. Under her tenure, the Girl Scouts introduced over 100 badges in Outdoors and STEM badges in areas such as robotics, coding, engineering, and cybersecurity.

In a Crain’s New York interview, Acevedo said, “Girl Scouts has always been an important part of my life, helping me as a young girl to develop the skills to become a leader,” Acevedo said in a statement. “My focus [at GSUSA] has been to raise the profile of the Girl Scout movement and mission, with the targeted aim to grow membership.”

In 2018 she was listed on Forbes’ "America's Top 50 Women In Tech".  In 2018, Fast Company named Acevedo one of its “100 Most Creative People in Business”. Acevedo was awarded the 2019 Hispanic Heritage Award For Leadership. In 2019, InStyle named  Acevedo in The Badass 50: Meet the Women Who are Changing the World.

Acevedo stepped down as CEO of the Girl Scouts on August 10, 2020.

Acevedo joined the board of directors of Qualcomm in November, 2020 and serves on its Governance Committee.

Significant publications

2018: Clarion Books, Path To the Stars, My journey from Girl Scouts to Rocket Scientist, an aspirational middle school memoir. Sylvia Acevedo 

2016: Harcourt Mifflin Houghton, Critical Growth Needs for English Learner Preschoolers, Sylvia Acevedo  

2016: UCLA White paper: Realizing the Economic Advantages of a Multilingual Workforce, Dr. Patricia Gandara, Sylvia Acevedo

References 

Girl Scouts of the USA national leaders
Jet Propulsion Laboratory faculty
NASA people
New Mexico State University alumni
Systems engineers
American women chief executives
Living people
Year of birth missing (living people)
1950s births
Engineers from South Dakota
People from Las Cruces, New Mexico
Engineers from New Mexico
Businesspeople from South Dakota
Businesspeople from New Mexico
20th-century American engineers
20th-century women engineers
20th-century American women scientists
20th-century American businesspeople
20th-century American businesswomen
21st-century American engineers
21st-century women engineers
21st-century American women scientists
21st-century American businesspeople
21st-century American businesswomen